Kirsten Peetoom (born 1 October 1988) is a Dutch racing cyclist. She finished fourth at the 2013 Erondegemse Pijl, tenth at the Parel van de Veluwe in 2015, and eighth at the Omloop van de IJsseldelta in 2018.

Personal life
Outside of cycling, Peetoom has been a PhD student in health sciences at Maastricht University since 2014, having previously undertaken studies at the University of Amsterdam, the Vrije Universiteit Amsterdam and Zuyd University of Applied Sciences.

See also
 2014 Parkhotel Valkenburg Continental Team season

References

External links

1988 births
Living people
Dutch female cyclists
People from Haarlemmermeer
Cyclists from North Holland